Dodici Morelli è una piccola frazione del comune di Cento nella  Provincia di Ferrara, Italia

Notes

External links
 Official website

Cities and towns in Emilia-Romagna